Pusey may refer to:

People
 Caleb Pusey (c. 1650–1727), friend and business partner of William Penn
 Chris Pusey (born 1965), Canadian ice hockey player
 Edward Bouverie Pusey (1800–1882), English churchman
 Ernest Pusey (1895–2006), World War I veteran and oldest living person in Florida
 Frederick Taylor Pusey (1872–1936), member of the Pennsylvania House of Representatives
 Jacqueline Pusey (born 1959), Jamaican sprint athlete
 Jason Pusey (born 1989), Gibraltarian footballer
 Joshua Pusey (1842–1906), American inventor of the paper matchbook
 Mavis Pusey (1928–2019), Jamaican-born painter
 Merlo J. Pusey (1902–1985), American biographer
 Nathan Pusey (1907–2001), American educator and 24th president of Harvard University (1953–1971)
 Philip Pusey (1799–1855), English agriculturalist and Member of Parliament
 Philip E. Pusey (1830–1880), English Aramaicist
 Peter Pusey (born 1942), British physicist
 Stephen Pusey (born 1952), British-born artist
 William A. Pusey (1865–1940), American physician and past president of the American Medical Association.
 William Henry Mills Pusey (1826–1900), U.S. Representative

Places
 Pusey, Haute-Saône, a commune of the Haute-Saône département in France
 Pusey, Ontario, a community in the township of Highlands East, Ontario, Canada
 Pusey, Oxfordshire, a small village with stately home, in Oxfordshire, England
 Pewsey, a village in Wiltshire, England

See also 
 Pusey and Jones, a former American shipbuilder and industrial-equipment manufacturer
 Pusey House, Oxford, an Anglican religious institution
 Pusey Street, Oxford, England